was a free-to-play online social role-playing game developed by CyberConnect2 and published by Bandai Namco for Android and iOS. It is the third title in the company's Little Tail Bronx series, acting as a spiritual successor to Tail Concerto and Solatorobo: Red the Hunter, and the first to appear on mobile devices. The project was headed by CyberConnect2's company president Hiroshi Matsuyama, and features music by Chikayo Fukuda with vocals by Tomoyo Mitani, who both previously collaborated on Solatorobo.

The game features a cast of anthropomorphic dogs and cats who must work together to battle monsters and obtain items, with its developer giving it the customized genre name . It was released exclusively in Japan on March 25, 2014, and shut down on October 30.

Gameplay
Little Tail Story is a 3D role-playing game presented from an overhead view where players undergo quests that involve exploring areas and battling monsters to obtain treasure. Players construct a party consisting of eight members, choosing from a variety of dog and cat species as well as a job class for each. During battle, enemies are arranged on a 3-by-3 grid, with each class having a specific attack radius. Only three party members may fight on the front lines at a time, but the player may rotate them in a circular fashion to change their positions, allowing them to hit enemies on certain panels. By defeating foes and completing quest objectives, items are obtained that may be crafted into stronger weapons and armor.

Development
Since the release of Solatorobo: Red the Hunter in 2010, Cyberconnect2 had expressed interest in creating more games in the Little Tail Bronx series despite the low sales of its two previous titles. In January 2014, Namco Bandai Games published a Japanese trademark for Little Tail Story, along with the genre "Dogs and Cats in RPG", followed by a teaser website promising an upcoming mobile game between the company and CyberConnect2. On January 30, a trailer was released officially announcing the title, as well as a projected release date of Spring 2014 in Japan.

Little Tail Story was headed by CyberConnect2 company president Hiroshi Matsuyama, with Ryo Mito of Bandai Namco Games acting as producer. Matsuyama explained that he wanted the game to be a "casual" and "friendly" experience, and developed the title for smartphones to expand the series to a larger audience, both male and female. Music for the game was handled by composer Chikayo Fukuda and vocalist Tomoyo Mitani, collectively known as "LieN", who previously collaborated on the soundtrack for Solatorobo: Red the Hunter.

The game features costumes related to characters from Solatorobo, in addition to other Bandai Namco properties such as .hack, God Eater 2, and Tales of Xillia.

References

External links
Official website 

2014 video games
Android (operating system) games
Bandai Namco games
CyberConnect2 games
Free-to-play video games
Inactive multiplayer online games
IOS games
Japan-exclusive video games
Little Tail Bronx
Multiplayer online games
Products and services discontinued in 2014
Role-playing video games
Video games about cats
Video games about dogs
Video games developed in Japan